Ramdaiya Bhawadi is a village in the Chhireswarnath Municipality of the  Dhanusa District in the Janakpur Zone and central development Region of south-eastern Nepal. The former Village Development Committee was converted into a municipality, merging along with existing VDCs Ramdaiya, Sakhuwa Mahendranagar, Hariharpur and Digambarpur on 18 May 2014. At the time of the 1991 Nepal census it had a population of 4,790 persons living in 977 individual households.

References

External links
UN map of the municipalities of Dhanusa District

Populated places in Dhanusha District

Ramdaiya Bhawadi